Favvara Chowk is an Indian television comedy series. Produced by H3 Entertainment, premiered on 5 December 2022 on Dangal TV. It stars Bharti Singh, Monalisa, Ali Asgar, Abhishek Verma, Surabhi Mehra, Samriddhi Mehra and Haarsh Limbachiyaa.

Plot 
The series is based in Indore, revolves around Ashok who runs a Jhama Jham Cafe with his son Manoj and Rama who runs her Madhuri Beauty Parlour with her twin daughters.

Cast 
 Bharti Singh as Favvara Devi
 Ali Asgar as Ashok 
 Monalisa as Rama
 Abhishek Verma as Manoj
 Samriddhi Mehra as Riddhi
 Surabhi Mehra as Siddhi
 Haarsh Limbachiyaa as Pappi Faraar

Production 
The series was announced in 2022 by Dangal TV. The promo of the series was released in November 2022. Monalisa and Ali Asgar were signed as the lead. The series is set in Indore, shooting began in November 2022 and  mainly shot at the Film City, Mumbai.

See also 
 List of programmes broadcast by Dangal TV

References

External links 
 
 

2022 Indian television series debuts
Hindi-language television shows
Dangal TV original programming
2023 Indian television series endings